Atlangatepec Air Force Station  is a military airport located 1.8 NM north of Atlangatepec, Tlaxcala.

History 
The airport was built in 1982 as Aeropuerto Nacional de Tlaxcala (Tlaxcala National Airport), however it did not have the desired success, for the year it registered more movements was 1994 with only 24 air operations. On March 3, 1997 the Tlaxcala State Government yielded the airport to SEDENA, making Base Aérea Militar n°19 Tlaxcala (Tlaxcala Air Force Base). In 2004 this air force base was turned into an air force station being named as Estación Aérea Militar n.° 9 Atlangatepec.

Facilities and squads 
It has a 8,235 feet long by 98 feet wide runway, as well a 75,350 sq ft aviation platform with a terminal building, control tower, parking for cars and a taxiway linked to the runway. Also it has a 14,200 sq ft aviation platform with a hangar and another taxiway linked to the runway.

This military airport is used by 601st Air Squad that operates unmanned aerial vehicles like Hydra S-45 Báalam, Hydra G-1 Guerrero, Hydra S-4 Ehécatl, Hydra E-1 Gavilán, ADS Dominator XP, Elbit Skylark and Elbit Hermes 450.

References

External links 
SEDENA

Airports in Mexico
Mexican Air Force